Darnytsia is the largest Ukrainian Railways station (and the main freight station) of the Ukrainian capital Kyiv, located in the city's Left-bank Darnytsia area.

Built in the nineteenth century, the Darnytsia railway hub has grown into a gigantic railway center, expanding for more than 10 km along the main east–west route. Started in 2004, construction is under way at the new Darnytsia railway terminal complex. When finished, the station will serve long-distance passenger trains, house own station of the Kyiv metropolitan, a two-storey car parking, a tunnel for automobile and tram traffic. The complex is meant to become Kyiv's second long-distance terminal, easing the traffic tension in the main Kyiv Passenger railway station.

Infrastructure
The Darnytsia hub comprises: several sorting yards, hump yard, commuter passenger terminal and two additional train stops, locomotive and railcar depots, Darnytsia Railcar Repair Factory railcar repair company, numerous industrial sidings.

Passenger service

Commuter service

On 16 February 2007, the renovated commuter train terminal (pair of mirroring opposite buildings) of the station opened to the public.

Commuter and intra-city directions from Darnytsia: Hrebinka, Nizhyn, central terminal (intra-city), Petrivka Railway Station (Kyiv) (intra-city).

On 30 November 2018, the Kyiv Boryspil Express high-speed train service linking Boryspil International Airport and Kyiv-Pasazhyrskyi was launched, which stops at Darnitsa station.

Long-distance service
Currently, most long-distance trains pass through Darnytsia non-stop; none of them originates or terminates at the station. However, the ticket boxes in the commuter terminals sell tickets for all long-distance routes in Ukraine.

Interconnections with city transport
In 2011, Darnytsia station became the terminus for the new intracity circle rail service called "Urban Electric Train". Trains for both circle directions arrive at Darnytsia and change heads.

Kyiv tram, buses and marshrutkas are connected to Darnytsia station, but they are not up to needs even for the existing commuter passenger flow.

The railway station is not yet interconnected with the city's rapid transit system, Kyiv Metro. The Darnytsia Metro station is situated well away, despite sharing precisely the same name.

Railway hub
Besides the passenger terminal, Darnytsia train station also has its own locomotive and railcar depots. In addition to the east of Darnytsia railway hub is located Darnytsia Railcar Repair Factory (DVRZ) which is a major railcar repair factory of the Ukrzaliznytsia.

Darnytsia locomotive depot is specialized in maintaining and repair of ChME3 locomotives.

Prospects of future expansion
Since 2012, Ukrzaliznytsia gradually increases the number of long-distance passenger trains that stop for Darnytsia in order to relieve the Kyiv Passenger railway station and prevent some of the passenger flow from crossing the overloaded city bridgesDarnytsia Station will also harbor a dedicated depot for Hyundai Rotem high-speed trains that are being launched by the Ukrzaliznytsia in 2012.

See also
Ukrzaliznytsia - the national railways company of Ukraine
Darnytsia Railcar Repairing Plant

References

External links

 Google maps - Satellite view of the Darnytsia passenger railway terminal
 Wikimapia Larger satellite view of the whole Darnytsia railway hub
 

Southwestern Railways stations
Railway stations in Kyiv